Meera Bai Public School, Nilokheri  is a private school, teaching students in middle grade in Nilokheri township of Karnal in Haryana, India. Meera Bai Public School, Nilokheri is one of the oldest school and is among the couple of schools in Nilokheri. The school was started in 1991 and has been constantly renovated to the modern building that exists today. As of the 2007-08 school year, the school had an enrolment of over 1000 students and employs 30 classroom with 50 teachers.

History
Meera Bai Public School, Nilokheri was established in 1991.  It is administrated by the school committee members.

Disciplines taught
With the best infrastructure school provides education to all age and interest of children. 
 Kindergarten 
 Senior Secondary 
 High SchoolCommerceHumanitiesMedicalNon-Medical

References

Schools in Haryana
Nilokheri
Educational institutions established in 1961
1961 establishments in East Punjab